Yoji Omoto (born 26 June 1967) is a Japanese water polo coach. He was the head coach of the Japan men's national water polo team at the 2016 and 2020 Summer Olympics. Omoto has a master's degree in physical education from the Nippon Sport Science University in Japan.

References

External links
 

1967 births
Living people
Japanese male water polo players
Japanese water polo coaches
Japan men's national water polo team coaches
Water polo coaches at the 2016 Summer Olympics
Water polo coaches at the 2020 Summer Olympics
Nippon Sport Science University alumni
20th-century Japanese people
21st-century Japanese people